A Wilderness of Vines is a 1966 novel by Hal Bennett.

Despite its overtly romantic cover, the novel is a serious satirical novel about post-slavery life in the South.

American satirical novels
African-American novels
Novels set in Virginia
Novels by Hal Bennett
1966 American novels
Doubleday (publisher) books